Hammad Tariq (born 22 December 1980) is a Pakistani first-class cricketer who played for Multan cricket team.

References

External links
 

1980 births
Living people
Pakistani cricketers
Multan cricketers
Cricketers from Bahawalpur
Bahawalpur cricketers